National Historic Landmarks in Indiana represent Indiana's history from the Native American era to its early European settlers and motor racing. There are 43 National Historic Landmarks (NHLs) in the state, which are located in 23 of its 92 counties. They illustrate the state's industrial and architectural heritage, as well as battles, circuses, education, and several other topics. One of the NHLs in the state has military significance, fourteen are significant examples of different architectural styles, nine are associated with significant historical figures, and one is an archaeological site. Two NHL properties, both ships that were formerly located in Indiana, were later moved to another state.

The National Historic Landmark Program is administered by the National Park Service, a branch of the Department of the Interior. The National Park Service determines which properties meet NHL criteria and makes nomination recommendations after an owner notification process. The Secretary of the Interior reviews nominations and, based on a set of predetermined criteria, makes a decision on NHL designation or a determination of eligibility for designation. Both public and privately owned properties can be designated as NHLs. This designation provides indirect, partial protection of the historic integrity of the properties via tax incentives, grants, monitoring of threats, and other means. Owners may object to the nomination of the property as a NHL. When this is the case the Secretary of the Interior can only designate a site as eligible for designation.

All NHLs are also included on the National Register of Historic Places (NRHP), a list of historic properties that the National Park Service deems to be worthy of preservation. The primary difference between a NHL and a NRHP listing is that the NHLs are determined to have national significance, while other NRHP properties are deemed significant at the local or state level. The NHLs in Indiana comprise approximately 2% of the 1,656 properties and districts listed on the National Register of Historic Places in Indiana as of December 2009.  The landmarks are among the most important nationally recognized historic sites in the state; the George Rogers Clark National Historical Park is one other site that has high designation by the Federal government.

Marion County, the location of the state capital Indianapolis, has the most NHLs, with ten, followed by Bartholomew County with seven and Jefferson County with four. Twenty counties have one, while the other 69 counties of Indiana have none. Indiana's first NHL was designated on October 9, 1960. Architects who designed multiple Indiana NHLs are Francis Costigan, William Dentzel, and Eero Saarinen.

Eight Historic Landmarks in Indiana are more specifically designated National Historic Landmark Districts, meaning that they cover a large area rather than a single building. The Lanier Mansion and Charles L. Shrewsbury House are within the boundaries of the Madison Historic District.

Key

National Historical Landmarks

|}

National Historic Landmarks formerly in Indiana

See also
List of U.S. National Historic Landmarks by state
National Register of Historic Places listings in Indiana
Historic preservation

References

External links

National Historic Landmarks Program at the National Park Service

Indiana
 
National Historic Landmarks